Steveston, founded in the 1880s, is a neighbourhood of Richmond in Metro Vancouver. On the southwest tip of Lulu Island, the village is a historic port and salmon canning centre at the mouth of the South Arm of the Fraser River. The early 1900s style architecture attracts both the film and tourism industries.

History

Pioneers

The village is named for Manoah Steves, who arrived with his family around 1877–1878 from Moncton, New Brunswick, via Chatham, Ontario. Born Manoah Steeves, a second cousin of William Steeves, he dropped the second 'e' en route. The family was the first white settlers in the area. The townsite began in 1880 as a crown grant to William Herbert Steves, his son. During the following decade, over 100 individuals purchased land in this original section comprising a grid pattern of 237 small lots. Becoming Steveston in 1889, this area south of today's Steveston Highway and west of No. 1 Rd. was the first subdivision in Richmond. In 1887, London's Landing, at the foot of No. 2 Rd., was also laid out on a grid. New Westminster-Vancouver Island ferries called at Steveston from the early 1860s onward, becoming a Steveston-Vancouver Island run in the 1920s.

Early commerce
Salmon canning began on the river in 1871 with the first major cannery being the Phoenix, established in 1882 by Marshall English and Samuel Martin. By the 1890s there were 45 canneries, about half of which were at Steveston, giving rise to the alternate name of Salmonopolis. Each summer large numbers of Japanese, Chinese, First Nations, and European fishermen and cannery workers descended upon the village, joining a growing year-round settlement. At the port, sailing ships loaded canned salmon for export. The fishery also supported a significant boatbuilding industry.

Steveston Fire Department existed 1912–1917. Otherwise, the closest firehall was Marpole, half an hour to an hour away, depending upon road conditions. A 1908 fire in the eastern section caused over $35,000 in damages. The 1918 inferno, totalling over $0.5m in damages, destroyed three canneries (the Star, Steveston, and Lighthouse), three hotels (Star, Richmond, and London), and most of Brick Block. The Marpole firetruck broke down on the way. This devastating fire started in a dining/recreational area of the Star Cannery. In 1897, this same cannery suffered the first significant fire in Steveston, requiring extensive rebuilding.

Steveston's aspirations to rival Vancouver as a port ended during World War I. Salmon runs peaking in 1913 was one of many factors. Canning activity slowly declined and finally ceased in the 1990s. The Gulf of Georgia Cannery, built in 1894 was at one time the largest plant in British Columbia. The cannery (1994) and Britannia Shipyard (1991) received National Historic Site designations.

The BCER Vancouver-Marpole-Steveston interurban tram operated 1905–1958. A new building houses the static tram car 1220.

Once a pioneer bank building, the Steveston Museum & Visitor Centre also operates a post office.

Steveston's Japanese Canadians
Japanese Canadians formed a large part of Steveston's original population. Tomekichi Homma, who settled in Steveston in 1883, was one of the important early members of the Japanese community in the village. Homma Elementary School in Steveston was named in his honour. Around 1897, the Fraser River Japanese Fishermen’s Association Hospital in Steveston was established since the local hospital refused to admit and treat Japanese immigrant patients.

The Japanese Canadian internment during World War II was a serious blow to the community, although some of the internees returned when they were allowed and a sizable Japanese Canadian community still exists. For example, a Japanese judo and martial arts centre was developed in Steveston after the internment.

During World War II, the Department of Transport facility monitored German and Japanese (Kana code) submarine traffic. The facility closed in 1945.

In 1954, BC Packers manager Ken Fraser donated a lot to Steveston's Japanese Canadian fishermen for the purposes of building a joint community centre (which eventually became the Steveston Community Centre); the terms of the agreement also stated that the Japanese Fishermen Benevolent Association be allowed to have a judo room at the centre.

In 1969, community discussion led to the development of a Japanese-style martial arts building for Steveston. The martial arts centre, now a Steveston landmark, is currently located adjacent to the Steveston Community Centre.

Post-war development
Along with Richmond, Steveston transformed from farmland to residential housing. Since the 1970s, the community, which remains an active fishing port, has enhanced its heritage character and waterfront to attract business and tourism.

Garry Point, at the southwest tip of the community (and Lulu Island), was named in 1827 to honour Nicholas Garry, former Deputy Governor of the Hudson's Bay Company. The company ships used this promontory as a navigational aid to safely enter the Fraser River. From the 1960s to the early 1990s, it was a federally-owned dump site for sand dredged from the river. Levelling the dunes created Steveston's largest park, opened in 1989. The site of the Steveston Fisherman's Memorial, the park was the major host location for the Vancouver-area festivities of the 2002 Tall Ships Challenge. Approximately 400,000 people came to see a fleet of restored sailing ships docked along the river. The financial loss incurred by the event prompted strong criticism from Richmond City Council. A maritime festival continues to be held annually.

In 1990, the Steveston Harbour Authority was established. In 1998, the 44-acre BC Packers cannery site was rezoned residential in exchange for keeping the waterfront portion publicly accessible. Years of controversy followed regarding the zoning of the foreshore buildings.

Filming location

Steveston is a popular location for filming both movies and television shows, which has included the following:

Tourism

Even with extensive redevelopment, Steveston maintains the character of a quaint, historic fishing village, with over 600 fishing boats––Canada's largest fleet calling Steveston Harbour home. It boasts over 350 businesses and services to accommodate a growing population. On sunny days, locals and visitors crowd the waterfront boardwalks to enjoy the scenery, people and food.

Steveston is also known as "The Gateway to the Orca," being a base for the whale watching industry. Shuttled by boat into the Gulf of Georgia, passengers observe orca (killer whales), seals, eagles and more.

Steveston Salmon Festival
On Canada Day, the community hosts the Steveston Salmon Festival, which has been held annually since 1946. This event includes a parade, and a huge barbecued salmon sale beside the Steveston Community Centre. Municipal, provincial and federal politicians often attend, usually as part of the parade and/or to hand out Canadian flags.

See also
List of canneries in British Columbia
List of World War II-era fortifications on the British Columbia Coast

Footnotes

References

External links
 Steveston Salmon Festival - Canada Day
 Virtual Museum

Neighbourhoods in Richmond, British Columbia
Fishing communities in Canada
Populated places on the Fraser River
Fishing communities
World War II sites in Canada